The Hohe Acht is the highest mountain in the Eifel mountains of Germany. It is located on the boundary between the districts of Ahrweiler and Mayen-Koblenz in Rhineland-Palatinate.

Geography and geology 

The Hohe Acht is located in the High Eifel east of Adenau. The mountain is a Tertiary volcano, whose cone is composed of Lower Devonian rock and whose summit is made of basalt.

Emperor William Tower 
In 1908/09 the Emperor William Tower (Kaiser-Wilhelm-Turm) was erected on the Hohe Acht. The occasion for the construction of this stone observation tower, based on plans by the architect, Freiherr von Tettau of Berlin, was the silver wedding of Emperor William II and Empress Augusta Victoria as well as the commemoration of Emperor William I

The work was carried out by master masons, Karl and Johannes Leidinger, from Adenau using local stone. The cost of construction was 18,000 marks. The tower has been a protected monument since 1987.

The Emperor William Tower offers a superb view across the whole Eifel (including the mountains of Scharteberg, Döhmberg, Michelsberg, Hochthürmerberg, Schöneberg, the nearby Nürburg Castle and Hochkelberg), as well as the Siebengebirge and its Großer Ölberg and, in conditions of good  visibility, as far as the Westerwald, the Taunus, the Hunsrück and the Lower Rhine.

Walking and winter sports 

There is a network of footpaths around the Hohe Acht; at many places there are good views over the Eifel landscape.

In winter the Hohe Acht has good winter sport facilities including prepared cross country skiing trails, toboggan runs and ski lifts.

Motor racing 
A section of the North loop (Nordschleife) on the Formula 1 racetrack at the Nürburgring is known as the Hohe Acht.

References

Sources 
 d'Hein: Nationaler Geopark Vulkanland Eifel. Ein Natur- und Kulturführer. Gaasterland Verlag, Düsseldorf 2006,

External links 
 WDR Winter Sport Tip – Hohe Acht 
 Rhineland-Palatinate Leisure Portal – Hohe Acht 

Ahrweiler (district)
Mayen-Koblenz
Mountains under 1000 metres
Mountains and hills of the Eifel
Mountains and hills of Rhineland-Palatinate
Monuments and memorials to Emperor William I
Volcanoes of Germany